Teleosauridae is a family of extinct typically marine crocodylomorphs similar to the modern gharial that lived during the Jurassic period. Teleosaurids were thalattosuchians closely related to the fully aquatic metriorhynchoids, but were less adapted to an open-ocean, pelagic lifestyle. The family was originally coined to include all the semi-aquatic (i.e. non-metriorhynchoid) thalattosuchians and was equivalent to the modern superfamily Teleosauroidea. However, as teleosauroid relationships and diversity was better studied in the 21st century, the division of teleosauroids into two distinct evolutionary lineages led to the establishment of Teleosauridae as a more restrictive family within the group, together with its sister family Machimosauridae.

Amongst teleosauroids, teleosaurids were generally smaller and less common than machimosaurids, suggesting the two families occupied different niches, similar to modern species of crocodilians. However, teleosaurids were more diverse than machimosaurids, with generalist coastal predators (Mystriosaurus), long-snouted marine piscivores (Bathysuchus), and potentially even long-snouted, semi-terrestrial predators (Teleosaurus). Additionally, teleosaurids occupied a wider range of habitats than machimosaurids, from semi-marine coasts and estuaries, the open-ocean, freshwater, and potentially even semi-terrestrial environments.

Classification 
Teleosauridae is phylogenetically defined as the largest clade of teleosauroids containing Teleosaurus but not Machimosaurus and Plagiophthalmosuchus. Teleosauridae is split into two subfamilies, the Teleosaurinae and the Aeolodontinae.

Palaeobiology 
Teleosaurids were originally regarded as marine analogues to modern gharials, as they both typically share long, tubular snouts and narrow teeth. However, differences in the jaws, teeth, and skeleton of different teleosaurids suggest that they were more ecologically diverse than this. Earlier teleosaurids were coastal semi-aquatic generalists, while the two subfamilies were more specialised. Teleosaurines appear to have been semi-terrestrial, as they were more heavily armoured and had forward-facing nostrils. In contrast, aeolodontines have been found in deep marine waters and had reduced armour, implying that they were open water predators similar to metriorhynchoids (although the oldest aeolodontine, Mycterosuchus, appears to have been semi-terrestrial, similar to teleosaurines).

Palaeoecology

Distribution 
Definitive fossils of teleosaurids are restricted to Laurasia, with material found in Europe(England, France, Germany, Italy, Portugal, Russia and Switzerland) and Asia (China and Thailand, and possibly India).

See also
List of marine reptiles

References

Jurassic crocodylomorphs
Prehistoric reptile families
Prehistoric marine crocodylomorphs
Toarcian first appearances
Hauterivian extinctions